The Salta tree frog (Boana marianitae) is a species of frog in the family Hylidae found in Argentina and Bolivia. Its natural habitats are subtropical or tropical dry forests, subtropical or tropical moist lowland forests, subtropical or tropical moist montane forests, rivers, freshwater marshes, and intermittent freshwater marshes. It is threatened by habitat loss.

References

Boana
Amphibians described in 1992
Taxonomy articles created by Polbot